Local elections (Indonesian: Pemilihan Kepala Daerah or Pilkada) were held in Indonesia on 9 December 2020. Voters elected nine governors, 224 regents, and 37 mayors across the country. All the elections were held on the same day, and over 100 million people were expected to be eligible to vote.

Background
Simultaneous local elections (Pilkada Serentak) was first held in Indonesia in 2015. The leadup to the 2020 elections saw several regulations being issued by the General Elections Commission (KPU) barring certain candidates from running, from adulterers to politicians who had been charged with corruption. The decision that the simultaneous local elections throughout Indonesia would be held amid the COVID-19 pandemic stirred some controversy in the Indonesian public.

Schedule
KPU released a schedule for the election in June 2019. Registration for the candidates would be held between 28 and 30 April 2020, with a campaign period lasting between June and September. The voting itself was initially planned for 23 September 2020. In October 2019, the Ministry of Home Affairs estimated that the election would require an expenditure of Rp 15.3 trillion (around US$1.1 billion), around double the budget for the 2015 local elections. In May 2020, due to the ongoing COVID-19 pandemic, President Joko Widodo issued a regulation postponing the election to December 2020, with further postponement being possible if the pandemic had not subsided by then.

The new schedule for the elections was released in June, with the new election date set for 9 December 2020 and the campaigning period being set between 26 September and 5 December 2020.

This election schedule planned by Election Committee (KPU) and the government was opposed by several activists because by forcing a major event during a pandemic, they were breaching several Laws (UU Kekarantinaan Kesehatan & UU Wabah Penyakit Menular) which raising the risk of disease contagion among the people. There were more than 1500 health protocol violations during the campaigns, and 70.000 ballot officers tested reactive from COVID rapid tests and could not immediately be replaced.

In December 2020 also, the government insisted to hold Pilkades Serentak (Simultaneous village leader elections) in more than 1200 villages.

Elections

Gubernatorial

Mayoral

Regency

References

Local
December 2020 events in Indonesia
2020 local elections
2020